Agrioglypta malayana is a moth in the family Crambidae. It is found in Taiwan.

References

Moths described in 1881
Spilomelinae
Moths of Taiwan